Eudalaca is a genus of moths of the family Hepialidae. There are 35 described species, most restricted to South Africa but a few found further north in the continent.

Species
Eudalaca aequifascia - East Africa
Eudalaca albiplumis - South Africa
Eudalaca albistriata - South Africa
Eudalaca ammon - South Africa/Zimbabwe
Eudalaca amphiarma - South Africa
Eudalaca aurifuscalis - South Africa
Eudalaca bacotii - South Africa
Eudalaca cretata - South Africa
Eudalaca crossosema - South Africa
Eudalaca crudeni - South Africa
Eudalaca eriogastra - South Africa
Eudalaca exul - South Africa
Eudalaca gutterata - South Africa
Eudalaca hololeuca - South Africa
Eudalaca holophaea - Congo basin
Eudalaca homoterma - South Africa
Eudalaca ibex - South Africa
Eudalaca infumata - Zimbabwe
Eudalaca isorrhoa - South Africa
Eudalaca leucophaea - South Africa
Eudalaca leniflua - South Africa
Eudalaca leucocyma - South Africa
Eudalaca limbopuncta - South Africa
Eudalaca miniscula - South Africa
Eudalaca nomaqua - South Africa
Eudalaca orthocosma - South Africa
Eudalaca rivula - South Africa
Eudalaca rufescens - South Africa
Larva feeds on grasses
Eudalaca sanctahelena - Saint Helena
Eudalaca semicanus - South Africa
Eudalaca stictigrapha - Zimbabwe
Eudalaca troglodytis - South Africa
Eudalaca vaporalis - South Africa
Eudalaca vindex - South Africa
Eudalaca zernyi - Tanzania

External links
Hepialidae genera

Hepialidae
Exoporia genera
Taxa named by Pierre Viette